Line 1 of Wuhu Rail Transit consists of 25 stations (all elevated stations) and  of track between Baoshunlu station in the north and Baimashan station in the south. It opened on 3 November 2021.

Stations

References

Wuhu Rail Transit lines
Railway lines opened in 2021
2021 establishments in China